Lautitia is a genus of fungi in the family Phaeosphaeriaceae. This is a monotypic genus, containing the single species Lautitia danica.

References

Phaeosphaeriaceae
Monotypic Dothideomycetes genera